Three regiments of the British Army have been numbered the 88th Regiment of Foot:

 88th Regiment of Foot (Highland Volunteers) (raised 1760), also known as "Campbell's Regiment"
 88th Regiment of Foot (1779) (raised 1779)
 88th Regiment of Foot (Connaught Rangers) (raised 1793)